Pseudomiccolamia pulchra is a species of beetle in the family Cerambycidae. It was described by Maurice Pic in 1916.

References

 Pteropliini
Beetles described in 1916